Nikolai Grigoryevich Pinchuk (4 February 1921 — 12 January 1978) was a Soviet fighter pilot and flying ace during World War II who totaled 20 solo and 2 shared aerial victories.

References 

1921 births
1978 deaths
Soviet World War II flying aces
Heroes of the Soviet Union
Recipients of the Order of Lenin
Recipients of the Order of the Red Banner
Recipients of the Order of the Red Star
Pilots who performed an aerial ramming